The Ankole-Watusi is a modern American breed of domestic cattle. It derives from the Ankole group of Sanga cattle breeds of east and central Africa. It is characterized by very large horns.

History 

The Ankole-Watusi derives from cattle of the Ankole group of Sanga cattle breeds of east and central Africa. Some of these were brought to Germany as zoo specimens in the early twentieth century, and from there spread to other European zoos. Some were imported to the United States, and in 1960 a herd was started in New York State by cross-breeding some of them with an unrelated Canadian bull. A breed society, the Ankole Watusi International Registry, was set up in 1983, and in 1989 a breed standard was drawn up. In 2016 the total number for the breed was thought to be approximately 1500 head, some 80% of them in the United States.

Characteristics 

The Ankole-Watusi may be a number of different colors, but is usually red. The horns are unusually large, with a wide spread and the largest circumference found in any cattle breed.

References 

Cattle breeds
Cattle breeds originating in the United States
Conservation Priority Breeds of the Livestock Conservancy